Gabriele Andretta (born 7 March 1961) is a German politician for the populist Social Democratic Party (SPD) and since 2017 President of the Landtag of Lower Saxony.

Life and politics 
Andretta was born in the Western German town of Murbach and studied social sciences and economics at the University of Göttingen.

In 1985, Andretta entered the SPD and served in leading functions in the regional group of Hanover.
Since 1998 Andretta has been a member of the Landtag of Lower Saxony, the federal diet of Lower Saxony; she became President of the parliament in 2017.

References 

Members of the Landtag of Lower Saxony
Living people
1961 births
20th-century German politicians
20th-century German women politicians
21st-century German politicians
21st-century German women politicians
Social Democratic Party of Germany politicians
University of Göttingen alumni